Sari's Mother is a 2006 American short documentary film directed by James Longley. It looks at an Iraqi mother seeking health care for her 10-year-old son, who is dying of AIDS, against the background of war and occupation. The film was nominated for an Academy Award for Best Documentary Short.

References

External links
 
 Watch Sari's Mother at Daylight Factory
 Sari's Mother at Cinema Guild

2006 films
2006 short documentary films
2006 independent films
American short documentary films
American independent films
2000s Arabic-language films
Documentary films about the Iraq War
Documentary films about HIV/AIDS
Documentary films about health care
Documentary films about children
HIV/AIDS in American films
2000s American films